Patrick Demarchelier (21 August 1943 – 31 March 2022) was a French fashion photographer.

Early life and education
Born near Paris in 1943 to a modest family, Demarchelier spent his childhood in Le Havre, Normandy, with his mother and four brothers. For his seventeenth birthday, his stepfather bought him his first Eastman Kodak camera. Demarchelier learned how to develop film, retouch negatives and began photographing friends and weddings.

Career
In 1975, Demarchelier left Paris for New York City, United States to follow his girlfriend. He discovered fashion photography by working as a freelance photographer learning from, and working with photographers such as Henri Cartier-Bresson, Terry King, and Jacque Guilbert. His work drew the attention of Elle, Marie Claire, and 20 Ans Magazine. 
He is perhaps best known for his intimate portraits of Princess Diana that helped establish her popularity and accessible public image. 

He later worked for Vogue and Harper's Bazaar, first in September 1992 which resulted in a 12-year collaboration. Demarchelier shot international advertising campaigns for Dior, Louis Vuitton, Celine, TAG Heuer, Chanel, Donna Karan, Yves Saint Laurent, Tommy Hilfiger, Carolina Herrera, Moschino, Vera Wang, Elizabeth Arden, H&M, Sam Edelman, Zara, Max Azria, Express, Longchamp, Blumarine, Lacoste,  Ann Taylor, Calvin Klein, and Ralph Lauren.

From the late 1970s on, Patrick Demarchelier photographed the covers for nearly every major fashion magazine including American, British and Paris Vogue. He also shot covers for Rolling Stone, Glamour, Life, Newsweek, Elle, and Mademoiselle. He  photographed many advertising campaigns, including Farrah Fawcett shampoo in 1978, the Brooke Shields doll in 1982, Lauren by Ralph Lauren, Cutty Sark, and a Calvin Klein ad with Talisa Soto and Giorgio Armani, Chanel, GAP, Gianni Versace, L'Oréal, Elizabeth Arden, Revlon, Lancôme, and Gianfranco Ferré. He was also the primary photographer for the book On Your Own, a  beauty/lifestyle guide written for young women by Brooke Shields. From 1992 on he worked with Harper's Bazaar, becoming its premier photographer. Demarchelier was awarded the contract for the 2005 Pirelli Calendar. Over the years he helped the careers of many make-up artists like Laura Mercier, Jason Marks, and Pat McGrath.

Demarchelier is referenced in the 2006 film The Devil Wears Prada. He also appears in the documentary The September Issue which is about Anna Wintour and American Vogue. He was called to do last-minute photographs for Grace Coddington after Edward Enninful's were not sufficient.

Demarchelier appeared in a cameo in the film version of Sex and the City; he can be seen taking pictures during Carrie Bradshaw's fashion shoot for Vogue magazine. He was featured prominently in the sixth episode of Cycle 15 of America's Next Top Model. He was listed as one of the fifty best-dressed over 50s by The Guardian in March 2013.

In 2007, Christine Albanel, French Minister of Culture, honoured Demarchelier as an Officer in l'ordre des Arts et des Lettres (Order of Arts and Literature).

Sexual harassment allegations
In February 2018, Demarchelier was accused by seven models who worked with him of sexual harassment. In response to the allegations, Condé Nast announced "we have informed Patrick we will not be working with him for the foreseeable future".

Death
Patrick Demarchelier died on March 31, 2022, at the age of 78.

References

External links
 Official website
 
 Demarchelier at Luminous Lint
Some of his most famous photographs
 Christy Turlington New York 1992
 Nadja Auermann Paris 1994
 Nadja New York 1995 .

1943 births
2022 deaths
Fashion photographers
French photographers
French emigrants to the United States
Artists from Le Havre
French expatriates in the United States
Officiers of the Ordre des Arts et des Lettres